The 1990 Major League Baseball postseason was the playoff tournament of Major League Baseball for the 1990 season. The winners of each division advance to the postseason and face each other in a League Championship Series to determine the pennant winners that face each other in the World Series. 

In the National League, the Cincinnati Reds and Pittsburgh Pirates both returned to the postseason for the first time since 1979. In the American League, the Boston Red Sox reached the postseason for the third time in five years, and the Oakland Athletics made their third consecutive appearance. The same four teams – the Reds, Pirates, Red Sox, and Athletics – had qualified for the postseason fifteen years before. They would all return again under an expanded format in the 2013 postseason.

This was the last edition of the postseason until 2006 to not feature the Atlanta Braves, who would make fourteen straight postseason appearances from 1991 to 2005.

The playoffs began on October 4, 1990, and concluded on October 28, 1990, with the Reds shocking the defending World Series champion Athletics in a 4-game sweep to win their first title since 1976. It was the Reds’ fifth title in franchise history.

Playoff seeds
The following teams qualified for the postseason:

American League
 Boston Red Sox - 88–74, Clinched AL East
 Oakland Athletics - 103–59, Clinched AL West

National League
 Pittsburgh Pirates - 95–67, Clinched NL East
 Cincinnati Reds - 91–71, Clinched NL West

Playoff bracket

American League Championship Series

Boston Red Sox vs. Oakland Athletics

This was the third postseason meeting the Red Sox and Athletics. The Athletics once again swept the Red Sox and advanced to the World Series for the third year in a row. The series was not close - the Red Sox were held to just one run in all four games. 

Both teams would meet in the postseason again in 2003, where the Red Sox defeated the Athletics in five games in the ALDS before falling in the ALCS.

As of 2022, this is the last time the Athletics won the AL pennant. The Red Sox would not return to the postseason again until 1995. They would return to the ALCS in 1999, but they lost to their archrival in the New York Yankees in five games.

National League Championship Series

Cincinnati Reds vs. Pittsburgh Pirates

This was the fifth postseason meeting between the Reds and Pirates. The Reds defeated the Pirates in six games to advance to their first World Series since 1976.

The Pirates stole Game 1 on the road by overcoming a 3-0 Reds lead to win 4-3. Despite Doug Drabek pitching a complete game for the Pirates in Game 2, it wasn't enough as the Reds evened the series with a 2-1 victory thanks to excellent pitching as Tom Browning out-dueled Drabek for the win. When the series moved to Pittsburgh, the Reds convincingly took Game 3, 6-3, to take the series lead. The Reds would overcome an early Pirates lead to take Game 4 by a 5-3 score and go up 3-1 in the series. The Pirates sent the series back to Cincinnati with a 3-2 victory in Game 5, as Drabek out-dueled Browning. In Game 6, the Reds narrowly prevailed as Luis Quiñones hit an RBI single to put the Reds ahead for good, securing the pennant.

This was the first of three consecutive losses in the NLCS for the Pirates. They returned the next year, as well as in 1992, and they lost both to the Atlanta Braves in seven games.

As of 2022, this is the last time that the Reds won the NL pennant.

1990 World Series

Oakland Athletics (AL) vs. Cincinnati Reds (NL) 

This was a rematch of the 1972 World Series, which the Athletics won in seven games. In what is considered to be one of the biggest upsets in World Series history, the Reds shockingly swept the Athletics to win their first championship since 1976 and their fifth overall. 

The Reds blew out the Athletics, 7-0, thanks to excellent pitching from José Rijo and closer Randy Myers, who blanked the A's offense the whole game. Game 2 was the only contest of the series to go into extra innings, and the Reds prevailed thanks to a walk-off RBI single from Joe Oliver. When the series shifted to Oakland, the Reds blew out the Athletics again in Game 3 to take a 3-0 series lead. In Game 4, Rijo, who was on three-days rest, along with Myers, helped preserve a one run Reds lead to complete the sweep and clinch the title.

To date, this is the last World Series appearance by the Athletics and Reds, as well as the last time that the World Series was won by a team from Ohio. 

This would be the last postseason appearance by the Reds until 1995, where the team was swept by the Atlanta Braves in the NLCS. The Athletics would return to the postseason in 1992, only to lose to the eventual champion Toronto Blue Jays in six games in the ALCS.

This was the last championship of the four major North American sports leagues won by a team from Ohio until the Cleveland Cavaliers made and won the 2016 NBA Finals.

References

External links
 League Baseball Standings & Expanded Standings - 1990

 
Major League Baseball postseason